Narong Wongthongkam (born October 2, 1982) is a Thai former professional footballer.

Match fixing scandal and ban
On February 21, 2017 Narong was accused of match-fixing on several league games. He was arrested by royal thai police and banned from football for life.

References

External links
 Profile at Goal
http://th.soccerway.com/players/narong-wongthongkam/287258/

1982 births
Living people
Narong Wongthongkam
Narong Wongthongkam
Association football goalkeepers
Narong Wongthongkam
Narong Wongthongkam
Narong Wongthongkam